So Outta Reach is an EP by American indie rock musician Kurt Vile, released on November 8, 2011 on Matador Records. Produced by both John Agnello and Kurt Vile & the Violators, the EP's tracks were initially recorded during sessions for Smoke Ring for My Halo (2011) and reworked in the summer of 2011. 

Upon release, So Outta Reach peaked at 28 on the US Billboard Heatseekers Album Chart.

The EP was subsequently included on the deluxe version of Smoke Ring for My Halo.

Background
Regarding the songs included on So Outta Reach, Kurt Vile stated: "There are a lot of songs on there that I wanted to fit on [Smoke Ring for My Halo], like "The Creature." I really wanted to get that one on the record."

Artwork
The EP's cover art features a collage of photographs featuring Vile asleep at a party. Regarding the cover, Vile noted, "I went to a party with my wife, and her friend Greg Chow—he's the Asian guy giving the devil horns—took the pictures. I drank too much tequila early on in the party, and he took all these photos and posted them online. Truthfully, I was embarrassed by them at first because I'm self-conscious, but my manager found them and was like, 'That's your cover.' I just laughed. And then he sent it to Matador, and they loved it."

Track listing
All tracks written by Kurt Vile except where noted.
"The Creature"
"It's Alright"
"Life's a Beach"
"Laughing Stock"
"Downbound Train" (Bruce Springsteen)
"(so outta reach)"

Personnel

Kurt Vile & the Violators
Kurt Vile – vocals, guitar, banjo, synth, optigan
Adam Granduciel – guitar, sweet tones
Jesse Trbovich – guitar, saxophone, synth
Mike Zanghi – drums, percussion

Additional musicians
Steve Shelley – drums (3)
Mike Polizze – bass (3)
Rob Laakso – bass (5)

Recording
John Agnello – producer
Kurt Vile & the Violators – producers
Greg Calbi – mastering

Artwork
Greg Chow – front cover photos and concept
Shawn Brackbill – back cover photo
Matt De Jong – design

References

2011 EPs
Kurt Vile albums
Albums produced by John Agnello
Matador Records albums